The 1981–82 NBA season was the Clippers' 12th season in the NBA and their fourth season in the city of San Diego.

Donald Sterling took over control of the franchise during this season, beginning what would be a 33-year stewardship.

Draft picks

Roster
{| class="toccolours" style="font-size: 95%; width: 100%;"
|-
! colspan="2" style="background-color: #E23B45;  color: #FFFFFF; text-align: center;" | San Diego Clippers 1981-1982 roster
|- style="background-color: #106BB4; color: #FFFFFF;   text-align: center;"
! Players !! Coaches
|-
| valign="top" |
{| class="sortable" style="background:transparent; margin:0px; width:100%;"
! Pos. !! # !! Nat. !! Name !! Ht. !! Wt. !! From
|-

Roster Notes
 Center Bill Walton missed the entire season again due to another left foot injury.
 This is Jerome Whitehead's second tour of duty with the Clippers.  He previously played with the team during the 1978-79 season.
 Guard Armond Hill is currently an assistant coach with the franchise since 2013.

Regular season

Season standings

Notes
 z, y – division champions
 x – clinched playoff spot

Record vs. opponents

Game log

Player statistics

Awards, records and milestones

Transactions
The Clippers were involved in the following transactions during the 1981–82 season.

Trades

Free agents

Additions

Subtractions

References

Los Angeles Clippers seasons
San